Gran Hermano 12+1: La Re-vuelta was broadcast on May 30, 2012 and ended on June 13, 2012. On May 24, 2012, during the main show of the Gala for Gran Hermano 12+1, the host Mercedes Milá confirmed that the Gran Hermano house will open again just three days after the Gran Hermano 12+1 finale, this time however with former housemates from last season of Gran Hermano. The grand prize of this season is €20,000 and every ex-housemate from Gran Hermano 12+1 could win the prize.

From 21 ex-housemates, Arístides Alonso, Juan Molina, Noemí Merino and Zulema Ibáñez declined the offer to enter the house again due to occupational or personal reasons. Pepe Flores, the eventual GH12+1 winner, did not participate in the "Re-vuelta".

Housemates

Voting history
 Head of Household
 Vote to Win

  Cristian opened the envelope, which revealed that the two housemates with the most votes would be evicted that night. Azucena and Marta received the most votes with three, so they were both evicted. 
  Ariadna opened the envelope, which revealed that the three housemates with the most votes would be evicted that night. Daniel received the most votes with five, so he was the first to be evicted. Then, Berta, Mary Joy, Sindia and Sergio received the second most votes with two, so Ariadna as HoH, broke the tie and choose to evict Sindia and Mary Joy. 
  David opened the envelope, which revealed that the three housemates with the most votes would be evicted that night. Berta received the most votes with five, so she was the first to be evicted. Then, Hugo, Maria and Sergio received the second most votes with two, so David as HoH, broke the tie and choose to evict Hugo and Sergio. 
  Alessandro opened the envelope, which revealed that the two housemates with the most votes would be evicted that night. Ariadna and María received the most votes with two, so they were both evicted. 
  Three housemates would be evicted on the second round of the final. All housemates received the same number of votes with one, so Alessandro as HoH, broke the tie and choose to evict Michael, Cristian and Veronica. 
  For the final round, the evicted housemates voted for the finalist they wanted to win.

Ratings

"Galas"

"El Debate"

"Última Hora"

References

External links
 Gran Hermano All Stars Official Website at Telecinco
 Gran Hermano Main Site

See also
 Main Article about the show

2010 Spanish television seasons
All Stars 3